A dictator is a political leader who possesses absolute power. A dictatorship is a state ruled by one dictator or by a small clique. The word originated as the title of a Roman dictator elected by the Roman Senate to rule the republic in times of emergency (see Roman dictator and justitium).

Like the term tyrant, and to a lesser degree autocrat, dictator came to be used almost exclusively as a non-titular term for oppressive rule. In modern usage the term dictator is generally used to describe a leader who holds or abuses an extraordinary amount of personal power. Dictatorships are often characterised by some of the following: suspension of elections and civil liberties; proclamation of a state of emergency; rule by decree; repression of political opponents; not abiding by the procedures of the rule of law, and the existence of a cult of personality centered on the leader. Dictatorships are often one-party or dominant-party states.

A wide variety of leaders coming to power in different kinds of regimes, such as one-party states, dominant-party states, and civilian governments under a personal rule, have been described as dictators.

__toc__

Etymology 

The word dictator comes from the Latin language word dictātor, agent noun from dictare (dictāt-, past participial stem of dictāre dictate v. + -or -or suffix). In Latin use, a dictator was a judge in the Roman Republic temporarily invested with absolute power. Typically, in a dictatorial regime, the leader of the country is identified with the title of dictator; although, their formal title may more closely resemble something similar to leader.

Originally an emergency legal appointment in the Roman Republic and the Etruscan culture, the term Dictator did not have the negative meaning it has now. A Dictator was a magistrate given sole power for a limited duration. At the end of the term, the Dictator's power was returned to normal Consular rule, though not all dictators accepted a return to power sharing.

The term started to get its modern negative meaning with Cornelius Sulla's ascension to the dictatorship following Sulla's civil war, making himself the first Dictator in Rome in more than a century (during which the office was ostensibly abolished) as well as de facto eliminating the time limit and need of senatorial acclamation. He avoided a major constitutional crisis by resigning the office after about one year, dying a few years later. Julius Caesar followed Sulla's example in 49 BC and in February 44 BC was proclaimed Dictator perpetuo, "Dictator in perpetuity", officially doing away with any limitations on his power, which he kept until his assassination the following month.

Following Caesar's assassination, his heir Augustus was offered the title of dictator, but he declined it. Later successors also declined the title of dictator, and usage of the title soon diminished among Roman rulers.

The term comes from Latin dictator, having same meaning as in English, originating in dicto 'I dictate', which comes from dicio 'exert authority; make a decision'.

Modern era 

As late as the second half of the 19th century, the term dictator had occasional positive implications. For example, during the Hungarian Revolution of 1848, the national leader Lajos Kossuth was often referred to as dictator, without any negative connotations, by his supporters and detractors alike, although his official title was that of regent-president. When creating a provisional executive in Sicily during the Expedition of the Thousand in 1860, Giuseppe Garibaldi officially assumed the title of "Dictator" (see Dictatorship of Garibaldi). Shortly afterwards, during the 1863 January Uprising in Poland, "Dictator" was also the official title of four leaders, the first being Ludwik Mierosławski.

Past that time, however, the term dictator assumed an invariably negative connotation. In popular usage, a dictatorship is often associated with brutality and oppression. As a result, it is often also used as a term of abuse against political opponents. The term has also come to be associated with megalomania. Many dictators create a cult of personality around themselves and they have also come to grant themselves increasingly grandiloquent titles and honours. For instance, Idi Amin Dada, who had been a British army lieutenant prior to Uganda's independence from Britain in October 1962, subsequently styled himself "His Excellency, President for Life, Field Marshal Al Hadji Doctor Idi Amin Dada, VC, DSO, MC, Conqueror of the British Empire in Africa in General and Uganda in Particular". In the movie The Great Dictator (1940), Charlie Chaplin satirized not only Adolf Hitler but the institution of dictatorship itself.

Benevolent dictatorship 
A benevolent dictatorship refers to a government in which an authoritarian leader exercises absolute political power over the state but is perceived to do so with regard for the benefit of the population as a whole, standing in contrast to the decidedly malevolent stereotype of a dictator. A benevolent dictator may allow for some civil liberties or democratic decision-making to exist, such as through public referendums or elected representatives with limited power, and often makes preparations for a transition to genuine democracy during or after their term. It might be seen as a republic, a form of enlightened despotism. The label has been applied to leaders such as Ioannis Metaxas of Greece (1936–41), Mustafa Kemal Atatürk of Turkey	(1923–38), Josip Broz Tito of SFR Yugoslavia (1953–80), and Lee Kuan Yew of Singapore (1959–90).

Military roles 
The association between a dictator and the military is a common one. Many dictators take great pains to emphasize their connections with the military and they often wear military uniforms. In some cases, this is perfectly legitimate; for instance, Francisco Franco was a general in the Spanish Army before he became Chief of State of Spain, and Manuel Noriega was officially commander of the Panamanian Defense Forces. In other cases, the association is mere pretense.

Crowd manipulation 
Some dictators have been masters of crowd manipulation, such as Mussolini and Hitler. Others were more prosaic speakers, such as Stalin and Franco. Typically the dictator's people seize control of all media, censor or destroy the opposition, and give strong doses of propaganda daily, often built around a cult of personality.

Mussolini and Hitler used similar, modest titles referring to them as "the Leader". Mussolini used "Il Duce" and Hitler was generally referred to as "der Führer", both meaning 'Leader' in Italian and German respectively. Franco used a similar title "El Caudillo" ("the Head", 'the chieftain') and for Stalin his adopted name, meaning "Man of Steel", became synonyms with his role as the absolute leader. For Mussolini, Hitler, and Franco, the use of modest, non-traditional titles displayed their absolute power even stronger as they did not need any, not even a historic legitimacy either. However, in the case of Franco, the title "Caudillo" did have a longer history for political-military figures in both Latin America and Spain. Franco also used the phrase "By the Grace of God" on coinage or other material displaying him as Caudillo, whereas Hitler and Mussolini rarely used such monarchical-associated language or imagery.

Criticism 
The usage of the term dictator in western media has been criticized by the left-leaning organization Fairness & Accuracy in Reporting as "Code for Government We Don't Like". According to them, leaders that would generally be considered authoritarian but are allied with the US such as Paul Biya or Nursultan Nazarbayev are rarely referred to as "dictators", while leaders of countries opposed to US policy such as Nicolas Maduro or Bashar Al-Assad have the term applied to them much more liberally.

Modern usage in formal titles 

Because of its negative and pejorative connotations, modern authoritarian leaders very rarely (if ever) use the term dictator in their formal titles, instead they most often simply have title of president. In the 19th century, however, its official usage was more common:
 The Dictatorial Government of Sicily (27 May – 4 November 1860) was a provisional executive government appointed by Giuseppe Garibaldi to rule Sicily. The government ended when Sicily's annexation into the Kingdom of Italy was ratified by plebiscite.
 Romuald Traugutt was Dictator of Poland from 17 October 1863 to 10 April 1864.
 The Dictatorial Government of the Philippines (1898–1898) was an insurgent government in the Philippines which was headed by Emilio Aguinaldo, who formally held the title of Dictator. The dictatorial government was superseded by the revolutionary government with Aguinaldo as president.

Human rights abuses 

Over time, dictators have been known to use tactics that violate human rights. For example, under the Soviet dictator Joseph Stalin, government policy was enforced by secret police and the Gulag system of prison labour camps. Most Gulag inmates were not political prisoners, although significant numbers of political prisoners could be found in the camps at any one time. Data collected from Soviet archives gives the death toll from Gulags as 1,053,829. Other human rights abuses by the Soviet state included human experimentation, the use of psychiatry as a political weapon and the denial of freedom of religion, assembly, speech and association. Similar crimes were committed during Chairman Mao Zedong's rule over the People's Republic of China during China's Cultural Revolution, where Mao set out to purge dissidents, primarily through the use of youth groups strongly committed to his cult of personality, and during Augusto Pinochet's junta in Chile.

Some dictators have been associated with genocide on certain races or groups; the most notable and wide-reaching example is the Holocaust, Adolf Hitler's genocide of eleven million people, of whom six million were Jews. Later on in Democratic Kampuchea, General Secretary Pol Pot and his policies killed an estimated 1.7 million people (out of a population of 7 million) during his four-year dictatorship. As a result, Pol Pot is sometimes described as "the Hitler of Cambodia" and "a genocidal tyrant".

The International Criminal Court issued an arrest warrant for Sudan's military dictator Omar al-Bashir over alleged war crimes in Darfur. Syrian dictator Bashar al-Assad, known for perpetrating numerous chemical attacks, is often regarded as the deadliest war criminal of the 21st century for inflicting industrial-scale atrocities in the Syrian civil war.

See also 

 Authoritarian personality
 Benevolent dictator for life
 Democracy Index
 Dictator novel
 Dictatorship of the proletariat
 Emergency powers
 Greek junta

 List of political leaders who suspended the constitution
 Nazi Party
 Strongman (politics)
 Supreme leader
 Totalitarianism

References 
Informational notes

 A He conferred a doctorate of law on himself from Makerere University.
 B The Victorious Cross (VC) was a medal made to emulate the British Victoria Cross.

Citations

Further reading
 Acemoglu, Daron, and James A. Robinson. Economic Origins of Dictatorship and Democracy (2009), scholarly approach to comparative political economy excerpt
 Armillas-Tiseyra, Magalí. The Dictator Novel: Writers and Politics in the Global South (2019) excerpt
 Baehr, Peter and Melvin Richter. Dictatorship in History and Theory (2004) scholarly focus on 19c Europe.
 Ben-Ghiat, Ruth. Strongmen: Mussolini to the Present (2020) scholarly analysis of 13 major dictators; excerpt
 Brooker, Paul. Defiant Dictatorships: Communist and Middle-Eastern Dictatorships in a Democratic Age (Palgrave Macmillan, 1997). excerpt
 Costa Pinto, António. Latin American Dictatorships in the Era of Fascism: The Corporatist Wave (Routledge, 2019) excerpt
 Crowson, Nick. Facing Fascism: The Conservative Party and the European Dictators 1935-40 (Routledge, 1997), how the Conservative government in Britain dealt with them.
 Dávila, Jerry. Dictatorship in South America (2013), covers Brazil, Argentina, and Chile since 1945. excerpt
 Galván, Javier A. Latin American Dictators of the 20th Century: The Lives and Regimes of 15 Rulers (2012), brief scholarly summaries; excerpt
 Hamill, Hugh M. Caudillos: dictators in Spanish America (U of Oklahoma Press, 1995). 
 Harford Vargas, Jennifer. Forms of Dictatorship: Power, Narrative, and Authoritarianism in the Latina/o Novel (Oxford UP, 2017).
 Kim, Michael et al. eds. Mass Dictatorship and Modernity (2013) excerpt
 Lim, J. and K. Petrone, eds. Gender Politics and Mass Dictatorship: Global Perspectives (2010) excerpt
 Lüdtke, Alf. Everyday Life in Mass Dictatorship: Collusion and Evasion (2015) excerpt
 Mainwaring, Scott, and Aníbal Pérez-Liñán, eds. Democracies and Dictatorships in Latin America: Emergence, Survival, and Fall (2014) excerpt
 Moore Jr, Barrington. Social Origins of Dictatorship and Democracy: Lord and Peasant in the Making of the Modern World (1966) online
 Peake, Lesley.  Guide To History’s Worst Dictators: From Emperor Nero To Vlad the Impaler And More: Nero Accomplishments(2021) excerpt, popular
 Rank, Michael. History's Worst Dictators: A Short Guide to the Most Brutal Rulers, From Emperor Nero to Ivan the Terrible (2013), popular.
 Spencer, Robert. Dictators, Dictatorship and the African Novel (Palgrave Macmillan, 2021).
 Weyland, Kurt. Revolution and Reaction: The Diffusion of Authoritarianism in Latin America (2019) excerpt

External links 

 
 Current Dictators of the World
 online books on dictatorship

Notes 

Heads of government
Heads of state
Positions of authority
Titles
Titles of national or ethnic leadership